Carl Edward Everett III (born June 3, 1971) is an American former Major League Baseball outfielder. A switch hitter, he played for eight teams over the course of a 14-year career.
He was a member of the Chicago White Sox when they won the 2005 World Series. He threw right-handed and played all outfield positions, and occasionally designated hitter.

High school years
Everett attended Hillsborough High School in Tampa, Florida and was a letterman in football, baseball, and track. In football, he garnered 948 rushing yards as a senior. Everett graduated from Hillsborough High School in 1990.

Playing career
He was the 10th overall pick in the 1990 Major League Baseball Draft, selected by the New York Yankees.  He was selected by the Florida Marlins in the 1992 MLB expansion draft, and made his major league debut with the Marlins on July 1, .

Everett was traded to the Mets after the 1994 season for Quilvio Veras. He hit .248 that season, with a .420 slugging percentage.

After the 1997 season, Everett was traded to the Houston Astros for John Hudek. That year, his .571 slugging percentage was in the top 10 in the league.

The Boston fans welcomed him at first, but their enthusiasm cooled somewhat after he was suspended for 10 days for bumping into umpire Ron Kulpa. The following year, Everett was fined for grabbing his crotch while yelling at Seattle Mariners pitcher Jamie Moyer after hitting a home run. One of the few bright spots for Everett that season came on September 2, 2001, when Everett came into the game as a pinch hitter and broke up a potential perfect game by Mike Mussina of the New York Yankees. Mussina had retired the first 26 Boston Red Sox and gotten two strikes on Everett before he hit a soft single to left center.

On December 12, 2001, Everett was traded to the Texas Rangers for Darren Oliver.  His nine home runs in April 2003 matched a team record that was shared (through 2008) with Iván Rodríguez (2000), Alex Rodriguez (2002), and Ian Kinsler (2007).

Everett was traded to the Chicago White Sox during the 2003 season for Frank Francisco, Josh Rupe and Anthony Webster.  He signed as a free agent with the Montreal Expos for the 2004 season, but was traded back to the White Sox on July 18, 2004 for Gary Majewski and Jon Rauch.

In October , Everett won his first and only World Series championship with the White Sox. Everett stepped in as the starting DH for most of that season for the White Sox after an early season injury to Frank Thomas.

On Mother's Day, May 14, 2006, Everett was one of more than 50 hitters who brandished a pink bat to benefit the Breast Cancer Foundation.

The majority of the time, he was a designated hitter and very rarely played the field, backing up the corner outfield positions. He played in 92 games before the Mariners designated Everett for assignment on July 26, 2006, effectively ending his tenure with the Mariners organization. At the time of his release, Larry Stone pointed out in the Seattle Times, he was 85th out of 86 AL players with qualifying at bats in batting average, at .227.

In 2007, Everett played for the Long Island Ducks of the Atlantic League of Professional Baseball. In 2007, he hit .312 with 25 home runs and 97 RBI. In 2008, he hit .327 with 29 home runs and 100 RBI in 115 games.

On May 11, 2009, Everett agreed to a contract with the Newark Bears of the Atlantic League of Professional Baseball to be their designated hitter.

Controversy
Everett is quite outspoken with his beliefs, and his remarks have proven controversial on several occasions. Perhaps the best-known of these was his denial of the existence of dinosaurs. He was quoted as saying, "God created the sun, the stars, the heavens and the earth, and then made Adam and Eve. The Bible never says anything about dinosaurs. You can't say there were dinosaurs when you never saw them. Somebody actually saw Adam and Eve eating apples. No one ever saw a Tyrannosaurus rex." He also derided fossils of dinosaur bones as man-made fakes. In reference to these comments, Boston Globe columnist Dan Shaughnessy dubbed Everett "Jurassic Carl." Everett, in turn, referred to Shaughnessy as the "curly-haired boyfriend" of Globe beat writer Gordon Edes.

Everett in an interview with Shaughnessy, questioned the validity of the Apollo Moon Landing.

Everett frequently got into altercations with umpires during his career. Some of these tirades have resulted in suspensions and fines. Everett's longest suspension came during the 2000 season after an incident in which he bumped heads with umpire Ron Kulpa while arguing Kulpa's ruling that Everett's batting stance was illegal. Everett was suspended for 10 games and fined $5,000. Everett has stated that he thrives on being hated, and that it keeps him on top of his game. Opposing players, umpires, and even his own teammates are not immune, as evidenced by his postgame shouting match with Seattle manager Mike Hargrove after a 14–6 loss to the Los Angeles Angels on July 5, 2006.

Everett has also made controversial remarks about homosexuality. He once said that if he had an openly gay teammate that he would consider retiring, or, at the very least, "set him straight." In the 2005 season, he told Maxim that he has had gay teammates and accepted them, but, "Gays being gay is wrong. Two women can't produce a baby, two men can't produce a baby, so it's not how it's supposed to be. … I don't believe in gay marriages. I don't believe in being gay."

In 1997, Everett temporarily lost custody of two of his children when a worker at Shea Stadium noticed his five-year-old daughter covered in bruises. A family court judge found enough evidence to suggest child neglect on behalf of Everett and his wife, Linda, the latter whom "inflicted excessive corporal punishment" on the children that Everett did nothing to stop. The Everetts never admitted to abuse or neglect, and a settlement was reached where they could be reunited with their children after undergoing therapy and attending parenting classes.

In April 2011, Everett was arrested at his home in Tampa on charges of aggravated assault with a deadly weapon and tampering with a witness. Everett held a handgun to the head of his wife of 18 years. He was held at a $5,500 bond and ordered no violent contact with his wife, who asked for his release so he could take care of their three children. In September 2011, he was arrested again, for assaulting a family member.

References

External links

, or Retrosheet, or Long Island Ducks, or Pelota Binaria (Venezuelan Winter League)

1971 births
Living people
African-American baseball players
African-American Christians
American expatriate baseball players in Canada
American League All-Stars
Baseball players from Tampa, Florida
Boston Red Sox players
Brevard County Manatees players
Charlotte Rangers players
Chicago White Sox players
American Christian creationists
Edmonton Trappers players
Florida Marlins players
Fort Lauderdale Yankees players
Greensboro Hornets players
Gulf Coast Red Sox players
High Desert Mavericks players
Houston Astros players
Long Island Ducks players
Major League Baseball designated hitters
Major League Baseball outfielders
Montreal Expos players
Navegantes del Magallanes players
American expatriate baseball players in Venezuela
New York Mets players
Newark Bears players
Norfolk Tides players
Players of American football from Tampa, Florida
Prince William Cannons players
Sarasota Red Sox players
Seattle Mariners players
Texas Rangers players
21st-century African-American sportspeople
20th-century African-American sportspeople